Sobaeksan National Park is located in the provinces of Chungcheongbuk-do and Gyeongsangbuk-do, South Korea. It was designated as the 18th national park in 1987. It is named after the  mountain Sobaeksan. The park is home to 1,067 plant species and 2,639 animal species. Reintroduction program of the critically endangered Korean Foxes with captive animals from the Seoul Zoo has been run to reestablish the local population of 50 by 2020.

References

External links
The park's page on Korea National Park Service's website

National parks of South Korea
Protected areas established in 1987
Parks in North Chungcheong Province
Parks in North Gyeongsang Province
1987 establishments in South Korea